The 2013–14 Australian Baseball League season was the fourth Australian Baseball League (ABL) season, and was held from 31 October 2013 to 8 February 2014. The season started with a game between the Melbourne Aces and the Canberra Cavalry at Narrabundah Ballpark in Canberra. The Perth Heat won their third title in four seasons defeating defending champions the Canberra Cavalry in the finals.

Teams

Regular season

Statistical leaders

Postseason
Three teams qualified for a two-round postseason. The highest placed team at the end of the regular season gained entry to and hosted the championship series. The other place was determined by a preliminary final series between the second and third placed teams, hosted by the second placed team.

Preliminary final series

Championship series

References

External links 
The Australian Baseball League – Official ABL Website
Official Baseball Australia Website

 
Australian Baseball League seasons
Australian Baseball League
Australian Baseball League